Greg Blache (born March 9, 1949) is an American retired professional football coach, most recently the defensive coordinator of the Washington Redskins. He served as Defensive Coordinator-Defensive Line 2004 through 2007 for the Redskins, followed by two seasons as the Defensive Coordinator under former coach Jim Zorn. He served as the Chicago Bears' defensive coordinator for five years prior to joining the Redskins.

Biography
On January 26, 2008, Blache was named defensive coordinator of the Redskins. He had spent the previous four seasons leading the Redskins' defensive line unit.

Blache used to be defensive coordinator in Chicago. In 2003, Blache's Chicago defense finished the season fifth in the NFC in total defense, and 14th in the NFL, the team's highest league overall-ranking since the 1998 season.

During his tenure, Blache's defenses forced 138 turnovers, including 37 in 2001, the most by a Bears defense since 1990, and accounted for 13 touchdowns (two in 1999, four in 2000, five in 2001, one in 2002, and one in 2003). Blache has retired, but has made public comments about Redskins' defensive coordinator Gregg Williams' use of a bounty system to reward potentially-injurious behavior.

1949 births
Living people
Notre Dame Fighting Irish football players
Notre Dame Fighting Irish football coaches
Chicago Bears coaches
Washington Redskins coaches
National Football League defensive coordinators